Gift Card Granny (or GiftCardGranny.com) is an online discount gift card retailer and comparison site based near Pittsburgh, Pennsylvania. The website allows consumers to search through numerous gift card websites and either purchase gift cards for a discounted price or sell them for below face value. The website contains over 100,000 gift cards from more than 1,000 different stores.

History
Gift Card Granny was founded by Luke Knowles in Fort Collins, Colorado in 2009. It was a part of several sites that Knowles had founded that were collectively called "The Frugals," (Coupon Sherpa and Free Shipping Day were two others). At the time, it was the first gift card comparison site. For most of the website's early years, Gift Card Granny was run solely by Luke Knowles.
 
In 2013, the website was acquired by internet entrepreneur and founder of GiftCards.com, Jason Wolfe, and his company, Wolfe.com. After GiftCards.com was acquired in early 2016 by Blackhawk Network Holdings, Wolfe became Gift Card Granny's CEO. In December 2016, Wolfe moved the company to Green Tree, Pennsylvania (a Pittsburgh suburb) to the same facility that had earlier housed GiftCards.com. The company currently employs 39 people.

Operation
Gift Card Granny is a gift card website that serves as a listing aggregator for discounted gift cards.  It partners with a variety of discount gift card companies and merchants. Users can search for specific gift cards from specific stores and will be presented with discounted prices from Gift Card Granny partners. Users can then choose which gift card they'd like to purchase and will be redirected to a partner website to complete the purchase.
 
Consumers can also look for gift card companies to sell their gift cards to on Gift Card Granny. Gift cards can be sold for below face value. Gift Card Granny lists gift cards from over 1,000 different stores including Walmart, Olive Garden, Starbucks, Home Depot, Target, Macy's, and numerous others. In total, there are over 100,000 gift cards listed on the website.

References

External links
Official Website

Companies based in Pittsburgh
American companies established in 2009
Retail companies established in 2009
Internet properties established in 2009